Ginchy is a commune in the Somme department in Hauts-de-France in northern France.

Geography
The graphic below shows the community in relation to nearby places.

History
Ginchy has a small park devoted to the memory of Captain Charles François, "Dromedary of Egypt" (1775-1853), who husbanded the camels during Napoleon's French campaign in Egypt and Syria.
 
Ginchy was at the centre of battle during World War I (1914-1918) and suffered severe damage as a result. It was used as an observation post by the Germans and was fiercely contested before being overtaken by Irish troops to conclude the Battle of Ginchy.

Population

See also
 Communes of the Somme department
 Battle of Ginchy

References

Communes of Somme (department)